Distorsionella is a genus of medium-sized sea snails, marine gastropod mollusks in the family Thalassocyonidae.

Species
Species within the genus Distorsionella include:

 Distorsionella lewisi
 Distorsionella pseudaphera

References

Thalassocyonidae